Iuaca nigromaculata is a species of beetle in the family Cerambycidae, the only species in the genus Iuaca.

References

Elaphidiini